Muhammad Nazreen bin Norzali (Jawi: محمد نازرين نورزالي) also known as Juzzthin is a Malaysian actor and rapper. He is known for his television debut for his role as Syed in Disney's Waktu Rehat.

Filmography

Film

Television series

Television movies

References

External links
 

Living people
Malaysian people of Malay descent
Malaysian Muslims
Malaysian male actors
1990 births